This page is a list of fictional hypnotists.

A–F
 Alucard – protagonist and antihero of the Hellsing manga and anime series created by Kouta Hirano; can communicate telepathically and hypnotize others
 Black Widow  (Natasha Romanova) – superhero in comic books published by Marvel Comics
 Bluto – in Popeye comics and cartoons
 Braden – Revenge of the Ninja
 Captain Universe – a Marvel Comics superhero; can hypnotize using his Uni-Vision energy
 The Amazing Conroy – in books by Lawrence M. Schoen
 Kenny Craig – Little Britain
 Crystal Ball, member of Cobra (G.I. Joe)
 Dansen Macabre – a Marvel Comics supervillain
 Diijon – The Mask of Diijon
 Doctor Druid – Marvel Comics
 Doctor Occult – DC Comics
 Doctor Nikola – in books by Guy Boothby
 Doctor Strange – Marvel Comics
 Dominique the Cyclops – Trigun
 Dracula – Marvel Comics
 Count Dracula
 Fakir – Cigars of the Pharaoh
 Vince Faraday – The Cape
 Fiddler – DC Comics
 Foreigner – Marvel Comics

G–L
 Gambit – Marvel Comics
 Hypno-Hustler – Marvel Comics
 Hypnota – DC Comics
 Hypnotia – Marvel Comics
 Jafar – Disney's Aladdin (1992)
 Jean-Claude – in books by Laurell K. Hamilton
 Kaa – The Jungle Book
 Karen, one of Crazy Jane's superpowered alters – Doom Patrol
 "Kujaku", assassin using hypnotic light projectors disguised as peacock feathers and cybernetic implants – Goku Midnight Eye
 Kurumu Kurono – Rosario + Vampire
 Lelouch Lamperouge – Code Geass
 Lilith – Marvel Comics
 Lira – Encantadia

M–R
 Mad Hatter (Jervis Tetch) – supervillain from DC Comics based in Gotham City, adversary of Batman. A master hypnotist who is delusional and believes himself to be the incarnation of Cappellaio Matto, A.K.A The Hatter, from Lewis Carroll's Alice's Adventures in Wonderland.
 Mandrake the Magician and his archenemy The Cobra
 The Master – Doctor Who
 Samira Mayer – Caminhos do Coração
 Mentok the Mind-Taker – Hanna-Barbera
 Mesmero – Marvel Comics
 Miracle Man – Marvel Comics
 Mister Mind and the Monster Society of Evil – Fawcett Comics; DC Comics
 Monk – DC Comics
 Morbius, the Living Vampire – Marvel Comics
 Baron Mordo – supervillain in comic books published by Marvel Comics, skilled at astral projection, hypnosis, and mesmerism
 Nati – Caminhos do Coração
 Orb – Marvel Comics
 Paibok – Marvel Comics
 Austin Powers
 Ringmaster – Marvel Comics
 Dr. Jeffrey Rosenberg/Van Helsing – Love at First Bite
 Ruvi, a member of the Carnival of Crime – The Cape
 Slowpoke Rodriguez – Looney Tunes

S–Z
 Satana Hellstrom – Marvel Comics
 Sauron – Marvel Comics
 Amanda Sefton – also known as Daytripper and the second Magik; a witch in the Marvel Universe; can summon powers including hypnotism
 Screenslaver – character created by Evelyn Deavor in Incredibles 2 who uses screens to control people by relaying an image in front of their eyes, is the main antagonist in the film.
 The Shadow and his enemies Shiwan Khan and Dr. Rodil Moquino
 Sinistron, amalgamation of DC's Psimon and Marvel's Mister Sinister – (Amalgam Comics)
 Siren – DC Comics
 Spellbinder – DC Comics
 Sublimino – Ben 10
 Super-Skrull – Marvel Comics
 Sōsuke Aizen – Bleach
 Svengali – Trilby by George du Maurier
 Universo – DC Comics
 Vlad – Caminhos do Coração
 Zorin Blitz – Hellsing

See also
Hypnotism
List of hypnotists
Mind control

 
Hypnotists